The Horla (also known as La Horla) is a 1966 French mystery and short film directed by Jean-Daniel Pollet.

Plot

Cast

References

External links
 

1960s French-language films
1966 films
French mystery films
1966 short films
1960s mystery films
1960s French films
French short films